Link Conexión Aérea, S.A. de C.V., operating as TAR Aerolíneas, is an airline in Mexico based in the city of Querétaro, the capital city of the homonymous state. It operates scheduled flights to 34 national destinations. Its inaugural flight occurred on March 3, 2014, between Querétaro and Guadalajara. The company currently operates a fleet of 12 Embraer ERJ 145s to 19 destinations throughout Mexico. Its headquarters and main operational base is in Querétaro, with Guadalajara, Monterrey and Puerto Vallarta serving as focus cities.

History
TAR began in October 2011, owned by the MAFRA Group (Grupo MAFRA). In April 2012 the Mexican government granted permission to make scheduled regular flight services to Link Corporación Áerea. In September 2012, Link purchased three Embraer ERJ 145 jets, with a capacity of 50 passengers, to be delivered in February 2014, to begin scheduled flight services. The airline started services in March 2014, as TAR Aerolíneas with a direct flight between Quéretaro and Puerto Vallarta.

TAR's aim is to become the strongest regional airline in the country, with a cellular multiregional growth strategy. With the development of regional routes, TAR aims to develop a strong presence in different regions including the Yucatán Peninsula, the Gulf of México, the Mid North region, the Pacific, and the South.

Destinations

TAR Aerolineas serves the following destinations within Mexico:

It was announced in September 2016 that the airline will begin international service from Querétaro to San Antonio, Texas soon. However, there was no further information in regards to the service, to date.

Fleet
The TAR Aerolineas fleet consists of the following aircraft (as of March 2023):

References

Mexican companies established in 2012
Airlines established in 2012
Airlines of Mexico
Querétaro